The David Hyatt Van Dolah House (locally known as The Castle) is a historic house located at 10 North Spencer Street in Lexington, Illinois. The house was built in 1898 for David Hyatt Van Dolah, a prominent local landowner best known as an importer and broker of French horses. Architect George H. Miller, one of the most well-regarded architects in the Bloomington area, and his partner James E. Fisher designed the house in the Queen Anne style. The front of the house features a large round turret on one corner, a wraparound porch, and a large stepped gable opposite the turret. The house's exterior is decorated with brickwork patterns, a slight departure from the ornamental woodwork usually used to side Queen Anne homes. The hipped roof of the house features cross gables, a cone atop the turret, and several pinnacles and spires.

The house was added to the National Register of Historic Places on September 14, 2015.

References

Houses on the National Register of Historic Places in Illinois
National Register of Historic Places in McLean County, Illinois
Houses completed in 1898
Queen Anne architecture in Illinois
Stepped gables